Durba Banerjee was the first Indian woman commercial pilot.

Early life
As a child while growing up Banerjee liked planes and flying, becoming a pilot was her passion. She was the first woman of her times to break stereotypes and venture into this field.

Career
Banerjee started her aviation career flying a Aircraft with Air Survey India as a DC3 pilot in 1959.

She then joined Indian Airlines retiring in 1988.It is heard that when she first approached then Central Aviation Minister Humayun Kabir to apply as a commercial pilot he was reluctant and instead offered her the post of a flight attendant.

She has to her credit the most flying hours with 9000 hrs.

 She became a Commander in the E27 turbo prop Aircraft 
 With the arrival of the B737 200 series she got herself type rated as a Jet Pilot

References

Aviation pioneers
Commercial aviators
Indian women aviators
Indian women commercial aviators